The Pasotti F.6 Airone was a low-wing, twin-engined, wooden, four seat civil aircraft built in Italy in the 1950s. Production was considered but only one was completed.

Design and development
The F in the designation of the Pasotti built F.6 Airone stood for its designer, Stelio Frati, who was responsible for several fast light wooden aircraft powered by either piston or turbine engines.  The Airone (Heron in English) was a low-winged, twin piston engine driven, four seater. It was intended as a general light four seater for private or executive use, or as an air ambulance.

The Airone's wings were built around a one piece single wooden spar and clad with stress bearing plywood.  They carried differential ailerons and trailing edge flaps. The fuselage structure and that of the conventional tail unit was similar, though the rudder and elevators were fabric covered.  The fuselage was built in two sections, bolted together behind the wing trailing edge.  The rear section tapered towards the tail, where the tailplane was fitted on its top and the fin blended in with a curved leading edge. The front section included the enclosed cabin with two pairs of seats. Dual controls were fitted.  There were wide doors on either side into the cabin; the baggage compartment behind it could be accessed from inside the cabin or by a separate external hatch. The only Airone completed carried its fuel in a tank ahead of the cabin, though production aircraft would have used wingtip tanks instead.

The Airone had a conventional retractable tricycle undercarriage with its trailing idler (knee action) main gear legs mounted below the engines. The prototype was powered by two flat 4-cylinder Continental C90 engines of 90 hp (67 kW) each, driving fixed pitch propellers.  Production aircraft would have been powered by two 105 hp (78 kW) Walter Minor IV inverted inline engines with variable pitch airscrews, though there were other possible engine choices in the  range. In February 1958 there was a report that Aeromere would produce the Airone powered with unspecified  engines in place of the Walters.  As with other proposals to produce the Airone, this too came to nothing.

Specifications (production aircraft)

Notes

References

1950s Italian civil utility aircraft
Low-wing aircraft
Twin piston-engined tractor aircraft